Abeiku Quansah (born 2 November 1990) is a Ghanaian professional footballer who plays as a midfielder or winger for Berekum Chelsea.

Club career
Quansah was born in Kumasi.

On 4 November 2008, he moved from Windy Professionals F.C. to OGC Nice and signed a contract between 30 June 2011. He came along with national teammate Enoch Kofi Adu. Quansah played his debut match in the Coupe de la Ligue against US Creteil on 11 November 2008 and his second game in the Coupe de France on 3 January 2009 against Arras Football.

In 2011, he went on to Arsenal Kyiv. He stayed throughout 2013, then joined El Gouna in Egypt.

International career
He was member of the Ghana national under-17 football team in the 2007 FIFA U-17 World Cup and played 6 games in the tournament in Korea Republic. On 1 January 2009, he was named for the Black Satellites for the 2009 African Youth Championship in Rwanda.

Honours

International
Ghana U-20
 African Youth Championship: 2009
 FIFA U-20 World Cup: 2009

References

External links
 

1990 births
Living people
Footballers from Kumasi
Ghanaian footballers
Ghanaian expatriate footballers
Ghana under-20 international footballers
Association football midfielders
Ligue 1 players
Ukrainian Premier League players
OGC Nice players
FC Arsenal Kyiv players
El Gouna FC players
Daring Club Motema Pembe players
Berekum Chelsea F.C. players
Expatriate footballers in France
Expatriate footballers in Ukraine
Expatriate footballers in Egypt
Expatriate footballers in the Democratic Republic of the Congo
Ghanaian expatriate sportspeople in France
Ghanaian expatriate sportspeople in Ukraine
Ghanaian expatriate sportspeople in Egypt
Ghanaian expatriate sportspeople in the Democratic Republic of the Congo
Windy Professionals FC players